Djalu Gurruwiwi, also written Djalu ( – 12 May 2022), was a Yolngu man from Arnhem Land in northern Australia, known worldwide for his skill as a player, maker and spiritual keeper of the yiḏaki (didgeridoo). He was also a respected artist, with works in several galleries.

Life
Gurruwiwi was born at the mission station on Wirriku Island (also known as Jirgarri), one of the smaller islands in the Wessel Islands group. He has also self-reported being born on Milingimbi Island (also known as Yurruwi, in the Crocodile Islands), with both of these island groups being off Arnhem Land in the Northern Territory, Australia. His date of birth is uncertain (the missionaries recorded his and two brothers as having the same birthdate – officially 1 January 1930), estimated 1940 or probably earlier.

He was given the European name "Willie" at some point, "Wulumbuyku" was another Aboriginal name, and his skin name was Wamut. His father was Monyu Gurruwiwi and his mother Djikulu Yunupingu.

He was a member of the Gälpu clan, of the Dangu language group of the Yolngu peoples. He grew up living a traditional life in the remote area, hunting turtles with his father on a lipalipa (dug-out canoe), and with little contact with "balanda" (white people). He remembered Japanese bombers dropping bombs on his homeland during World War II, and later working alongside Japanese pearlers. The family, along with others in the clan, spent long periods on the remote island of Rrakala. They travelled across the chain of Wessel Islands from Nhulunbuy in dug-out canoes, using carved wooden paddles.

As a young man Gurruwiwi lived on Galiwinku (Elcho Island), working as a lumberjack, cutting large trees by hand. He was also given the responsibility for carrying out punishment for tribal law, becoming both respected and feared.

After a period when he succumbed to the destructive effects of alcohol after it was introduced to the remote areas, he says he was visited by a spirit in gaol one night and "found Jesus". He gave up drinking and devoted his life to the yiḏaki and spiritual and other studies. In 1994 he completed studies in Christian theology at Nungalinya College in Darwin, and became a respected Yolŋu lawman as well as a Christian leader.

As of 2020, Gurruwiwi and his family, along with some other members of the Galpu clan, lived at Birritjimi (also known as Wallaby Beach) on the Gove Peninsula They live in homes constructed in the 1970s to provide accommodation for Rio Tinto mining executives, handed over to traditional owners represented by Rirratjingu Aboriginal Corporation in 2008. The houses are in very poor condition and are facing demolition, as they are no longer deemed safe. The Northern Territory Government is providing emergency repairs, but says that the Northern Land Council is responsible for the maintenance of the homes. Rirratjingu has applied for funds to help move the residents to Nhulunbuy, Gunyangara and Yirrkala, but Djalu and his son Larry were reluctant to leave Birritjimi.

Gurruwiwi died in Arnhem Land after a long illness on 12 May 2022, believed to be aged in his late 80s.

Family
Gurruwiwi's wife is a sister of Geoffrey Gurrumul Yunupingu, and they have several sons and at least one daughter, Zelda.

His son Larry Larrtjaŋga Gurruwiwi is the future spiritual keeper of the yiḏaki and custodian of the Yolngu songlines and healing techniques passed down by his father. He featured as a didgeridu player in the feature film Jindalee Lady (1992), directed by Aboriginal director Brian Syron (credited as Larry Yapuma Gurruwiwi).

Larry and Andrew Gäyalaŋa Gurruwiwi led the Bärra West Wind band, with Jason Guwanbal Gurruwiwi, Vernon Marritŋu Gurruwiwi, Dion Marimunuk Gurruwiwi, and Adrian Guyundu Gurruwiwi also listed as members of the band in 2010. The band and Larry are featured in the 2017 film Westwind: Djalu’s Legacy.

Larry, Jason and Vernon, in their new band, Malawurr, performed in Melbourne in June 2019 to help raise funds for the new film, Morning Star (see below) ahead of their first European tour, playing at WOMAD in the UK and other festivals in England and France. The band was scheduled to give a yiḏaki workshop and performance at the Rainbow Serpent Festival at Lexton, Victoria on 26 January 2020.

Music, culture and law

Gurruwiwi spent much time over several decades crafting his instruments and refining his technique. He sold his pieces to the local community arts centre, and various non-Indigenous workers and visitors.

Gurruwiwi was a senior member of his clan, having learned to play and make the yiḏaki from his father, Monyu, an important leader and warrior. Monyu gave Djalu the role of primary custodian of the yiḏaki for his clan, which is significant also for the wider Yolŋu communities, because other Arnhem Land clans see the Gälpu clan as one of the primary custodians of the instrument. However, there are many other Yolŋu people with the same role within their own clan, and their own particular type of yiḏaki.

Upon the death of his father, Djalu assumed the role of the elder responsible for passing on the skills as well as the cultural importance of the instrument. He became known among his people as the senior player and maker of the yiḏaki after attending many ceremonies with his brothers, who were singers, and also became fully informed in Yolŋu law. Much of the knowledge and cultural practice that he acquired is held sacred, so Gurruwiwi is held in high esteem.

In 1986, his reputation as craftsman was given a world stage when several of his friends and relatives formed the musical group Yothu Yindi, and commissioned Gurruwiwi to make their yiḏakis. Yothu Yindi has both Yolŋu and balanda members and spanned cultural boundaries, going on to win several ARIA awards and international fame.

Gurruwiwi's source of spiritual power has been linked to Wititj, the huge ancestral rainbow serpent. In the clan legends, the Wititj was said to create thunder and lightning as it moved across the land, but is also associated with the calm freshwater systems where the spirits reside, among water lilies and palm trees. The yiḏaki sometimes also contain these qualities: some have powerful acoustics, called baywarayiḏaki, (the power of lightning and thunder); others are Djuŋgarriny, long and deep-sounding, with a gentle, soothing sound, but also powerful: the vibrations are said to stir Wititj.

Art
Guruwiwi's art includes printmaking and earth pigments on stringybark (also known as bark paintings). He was also a painter of sacred miny'tji and a maker of sacred raŋga, objects rarely seen by outsiders.

Gurruwiwi is a respected artist, with his bark paintings on eucalyptus bark being acquired by numerous important institutions, including the National Gallery of Victoria, the Art Gallery of South Australia, the South Australian Museum, the Kluge-Ruhe Aboriginal Art Collection of the University of Virginia and many private collections. His work has been included in numerous exhibitions since 1990.

Some of his themes, styles and types of work include:
Mandji-dak body painting
Clan miny’tji (designs of saltwater and freshwater areas)
Wititj (olive python)
Dhonyin (Javan file snake)
Bol’ngu ("the Thunderman")

Tours and performances

He has attended numerous other festivals and events both in Australia and abroad, including: 
 2002 Rripangu Yiḏaki Festival, Eisenbach, Germany
 2003 Joshua Tree Festival, USA
 2003 Indigenous Peoples Commission cultural visit, Taipei, Taiwan
 2004 Dubai Sister Cities Forum, United Arab Emirates
 2005 Yiḏaki Festa 2005, Okuhida & Tokyo, Japan
 2005 Played for Nelson Mandela in Sydney
 2007 Mulu Music Festival, Mooloolaba, Australia

At the 2015 edition of Womadelaide, he participated in an "Artists in Conversation" session as well as a performance that included Gotye and the Bärra (West Wind) musicians in Adelaide, South Australia.

Awards
Guruwiwi won the 2015 National Indigenous Music Award in the Traditional Song of the Year category, with East Journey, for Mokuy & Bonba.

Partial discography
Gurruwiwi's music released on CD includes:
Waluka: Gurritjiri Gurriwiwi, featuring Djalu Gurruwiwi. Traditional music from north-east Arnhem Land, Volume 2. Yothu Yindi Foundation – Contemporary Masters Series, 2001
Djalu teaches and plays yidaki (didjeridu). Traditional music from north-east Arnhem Land, Volume 3. Yothu Yindi Foundation – Contemporary Masters Series, 2001
Djalu Plays and Teaches Yidaki, Volume 2 (Songs and Stories from the Galpu Clan). Traditional music from north-east Arnhem Land, Volume 6. Yothu Yindi Foundation – Contemporary Masters Series, 2003
Diltjimurru: Djalu Gurruwiwi. ON-Records & Djalu Gurruwiwi, 2003

Films and videos

Westwind: Djalu’s Legacy

In 2017, Westwind: Djalu's Legacy was released. It was directed by British filmmaker Ben Strunin, and Djalu's son Larry Gurruwiwi and multi-instrumentalist singer-songwriter Gotye are in the cast. Initially titled Baywara (Yolngu for "lightning power", which features as a theme), the story tells of Gurruwiwi's need to pass on the sacred knowledge of the yidaki and its songlines, and Larry's initial reluctance to take on the role. The film's title echoes that of Larry's band, Bärra West Wind (Bärra being the Galpu name of the West Wind songline).

The film played to packed houses at the 2018 Melbourne International Film Festival.  With all proceeds for the sales of tickets and movie premieres to be paid to Zelda at Royal Galpu NGO based in Darwin and Circa 24, Darwin. Currently, the Interpol arts department is working with 5 PI's and the above parties to make sure that Ben Strunin and also Madhouse Pictures, and all entities pay the appropriate funds to the Galpu people as a massive shakedown is coming on the art collection and more via ICJ courts Lyon France.Please notify our lawyers in Sydney via the CIRCA 24 Page on Facebook and other social media links coming so that the right ETHICAL and FAIRTRADE approach can be taken for and with the GALPU people, instead of the constant exploitation ( and TERMS of slavery) by Ben and others, which contravenes International law, and is jailable up to 25 years under articles 30 and 33 of ICPRC of Human Rights law.

Other
Gurruwiwi has also featured in other films:
2000 Yidaki. Directed by Michael Butler, narrated by Jack Thompson, produced by Michelle White for Discovery Channel 
2014 In Between Songs. Written, directed, produced, and co-edited by Joshua Bell and narrated by James Cromwell. In 2006, Bell spent six months in Nhulunbuy with Gurruwiwi, his wife, his sister, and various family members who came and went; they also traveled to the remote island of Rrakala, where Gurruwiwi and his family lived for long stretches when he was a child.

He also features in numerous YouTube videos, which attract tens of thousands of views.

Morning Star
It follows the brothers' band, Malawurr, on tour through England, the Czech Republic, Wales, and France in 2019. The film will also include Larry's participation in groundbreaking medical research, "to quantify the effects of the traditional vibrational sound healing that he was taught by Djalu".

Notes

See also

List of didgeridoo players

References

External links
 
 

1930s births
2022 deaths
Didgeridoo players
Indigenous Australian musicians
Musicians from the Northern Territory
Yolngu people
20th-century Australian musicians
20th-century Australian male musicians
21st-century Australian musicians
21st-century Australian male musicians